Çetmi is a small town in Taşkent district of Konya Province, Turkey. According to mayor's page the original name was Çepni (referring to a branch of Oghuz Turks); but eventually the word Çepni was corrupted to Çetmi. The population of the town was 1281   as of 2011.

References

Populated places in Konya Province
Towns in Turkey
Taşkent District